FIJ may refer to:

 Fiji
 Fijian language
 Fellow of the Institute of Journalists
 Juventutem, a Roman Catholic youth movement
 Renze Fij (born 1992), Dutch Footballer